The 1976 Aryamehr Cup was a men's professional tennis tournament played on outdoor clay courts in Tehran in Iran. The event was part of the 1976 Commercial Union Assurance Grand Prix as a Five Star category event. It was the fifth edition of the tournament and was held from 4 October through 10 October 1976. Manuel Orantes won the singles title.

Finals

Singles
 Manuel Orantes defeated  Raúl Ramírez 7–6, 6–0, 2–6, 6–4
 It was Orantes' 4th title of the year and the 23rd of his career.

Doubles
 Wojciech Fibak /  Raúl Ramírez defeated  Juan Gisbert, Sr. /  Manuel Orantes 7–5, 6–1
 It was Fibak's 6th title of the year and the 11th of his career. It was Ramirez' 13h title of the year and the 34th of his career.

References

External links
ITF tournament edition details

Aryamehr Cup
1976 Grand Prix (tennis)